Robert M. Weaver is a healthcare consultant who specializes in Native American healthcare. He is an enrolled member of the Quapaw Tribe of Oklahoma.

Weaver was nominated by President Donald Trump to become Director of the Indian Health Service in the United States Department of Health and Human Services.  Weaver's nomination hit a snag when The Wall Street Journal published an article questioning the accuracy of his resume. Senator Tom Udall said he had concerns with Weaver. A subsequent Wall Street Journal report described a personal bankruptcy and IRS tax liens (now satisfied). Roll Call reported that Weaver had failed to declare $3,500 contributed to Trump's 2020 campaign. As of February 21, 2018, HHS reported that Weaver was no longer a candidate for the post.

Weaver serves as the consultative representative to the U.S. government for his tribe in the area of healthcare. He is the founder and owner of four companies that provide healthcare consulting services to tribal governments. Weaver is chief executive of RWI Benefits, a firm he founded in 2007. He previously worked in insurance billing and managing physicians' practices.

References

Living people
United States Department of Health and Human Services officials
Trump administration personnel
Missouri Southern State University alumni
1979 births
Universidad Michoacana de San Nicolás de Hidalgo alumni
People from Grove, Oklahoma